Major Charles Henry Lyell (18 May 1875 – 18 October 1918) was a British politician and Liberal Member of Parliament who died in the First World War.

Education and private life

Lyell was born in 1875, the only son of Leonard Lyell, 1st Baron Lyell, and was educated at Eton and New College, Oxford. Whilst at Oxford he became a Freemason in the Apollo University Lodge, a Masonic lodge for students and former students of the university.

He married Rosalind Margaret Watney on 18 May 1911 at Cornbury Park, Oxfordshire. They had one son, Charles Anthony Lyell (later 2nd Baron Lyell) and one daughter, Margaret Laetitia.

Political career
Lyell was elected to represent East Dorset in a 1904 by-election, and was appointed as Parliamentary Private Secretary to Sir Edward Grey, the Foreign Secretary, in 1906. He was re-elected at the 1906 general election, but failed to win election in the January 1910 general election, where he contested Edinburgh West. He was elected for Edinburgh South at a by-election in April, and won re-election in the December general election. He was appointed as the Parliamentary Private Secretary to H. H. Asquith, the Prime Minister, in February 1911, and stood down from the seat in May 1917.

Military career
Lyell was commissioned as a lieutenant in the Forfar and Kincardine Artillery Militia in 1900, and served until 1908 when the Militia was dissolved under the Territorial and Reserve Forces Act 1907. He then served as the vice-chairman of the County Territorial Association for Forfarshire. On the outbreak of the First World War, he was gazetted a captain in the Fife Royal Garrison Artillery, and in May 1915 made a major in the Highland Battery of the Fife RGA.

Death

Charles Henry Lyell died on 18 October 1918 of pneumonia during the global Spanish flu pandemic while serving as Assistant Military Attaché to the US, and was buried at Arlington National Cemetery. Lyell is commemorated on Panel 1 of the Parliamentary War Memorial in Westminster Hall, one of 22 MPs that died during the First World War to be named on that memorial. A further act of commemoration came with the unveiling in 1932 of a manuscript-style illuminated book of remembrance for the House of Commons, which includes a short biographical account of the life and death of Lyell.

Notes

References
 "LYELL, Hon. Charles Henry", in 
Obituary in The Times, p. 5, 19 October 1918

External links 
 

1875 births
1918 deaths
Scottish Liberal Party MPs
Liberal Party (UK) MPs for English constituencies
UK MPs 1900–1906
UK MPs 1906–1910
UK MPs 1910
UK MPs 1910–1918
Parliamentary Private Secretaries to the Prime Minister
Royal Garrison Artillery officers
Burials at Arlington National Cemetery
British Army personnel of World War I
Heirs apparent who never acceded
People educated at Eton College
Alumni of New College, Oxford
Deaths from the Spanish flu pandemic in the United States
Members of the Parliament of the United Kingdom for Edinburgh constituencies
British military personnel killed in World War I